The Foton Tunland Yutu is a mid-size pickup truck made by Foton from 2019. The Yutu is available as a few different variants including the Yutu 8 and Yutu 9. A more premium variant called the General F9 is also available from 2022.

Overview

The Foton Tunland Yutu is available in a few different variants called the Tunland Yutu 8 and Tunland Yutu 9 respectively. In early 2019, leaked information indicates that the maximum power output of the Tunland Yutu is 120kw and the maximum speed is 165km/h. The maximum torque of the engine is expected to be 350N·m. Additionally, a 2.0 liter turbo diesel engine code-named 4F20TC is also listed with a maximum power of 125kW and maximum torque of 400N·m. All versions are launched with a 6-speed manual transmission, while the more premium General F9 launched in 2022 was offered with a 8-speed automatic transmission.

Foton Tunland Electric Pickup
On February 11 2022, Foton Tunland pure electric pickup was officially launched with a price of 328,800 yuan (~US$51,753). The Tunland Electric Pickup is based on the regular Tunland Yutu pickup truck and has an official range of 536 kilometers. The Tunland Electric Pickup is equipped with an electric motor with a maximum power output of 130 kilowatts and a maximum torque of 330 Nm. The cargo bed dimension is 1520mm by 1580 bymm 440mm.

References

Pickup trucks
Cars of China
Cars introduced in 2019